Burn is a village and civil parish in the Selby District, North Yorkshire, England. It is situated some three miles south of Selby. The village is mainly situated around the main A19 road with the addition of a small housing estate built in the mid-1960s to the west of the main road.

The village was historically part of the West Riding of Yorkshire until 1974.

History
To the east of the A19 is Burn Airfield, built in 1942 as a bomber airfield in the Second World War.  The airfield was owned by Yorkshire Forward (the regional development agency) prior to the dissolution of that body in 2012, and is now owned by the Homes and Communities Agency. It is now used by Burn Gliding Club.  For some time in the early 21st century there were plans that the airfield might be developed as the site of the European Spallation Source (ESS), a particle accelerator facility to generate neutrons by spallation.  Outline planning permission for the ESS was conditionally granted by Selby District Council on 14 September 2005.  However, later statements by Lord Sainsbury the then outgoing UK Science Minister that "no major science facility should be built outside existing sites at Oxford and Daresbury" made it appear unlikely that the project would go ahead.

Burn has its own telephone exchange which serves about 400 premises. It was enabled for ADSL in October 2004 and ADSL Max in March 2006. It has been accepting orders for FTTC BT Infinity since February 2014.

In the 20th century, Burn had a missionary house that was used as a Sunday School. It is now a private dwelling.

George King, a great-grandfather of the Colombian footballer Radamel Falcao, was born in the village.

Burn also has a public house called The Wheatsheaf Inn.

The Murder of Chen Cai Guan

In January 2009, Chinese national Chen Cai Guan was tortured and beaten to death in a warehouse on an Elvington Industrial Estate, just outside York. The two men responsible for the murder Huang Bao Lung and Zhang Zhouli both admitted links to the 14K Triads, a Hong Kong based criminal gang. Huang and Zhang rented the warehouse as part of a nationwide Cannabis factory operation, using a food storage business as a front.

In March 2009, the body of Mr Chen was found by fishermen at the canal in Burn. When the North Yorkshire Police raided the facility shortly after the murder took place, they seized 1,500 Cannabis plants and arrested the suspects, also finding traces of the victims blood that they had failed to cover up.

In July, Both Huang, from Fujian in China, and Zhang, from Dong Bei, were handed life sentences in with minimum terms of 18 years and 16 years respectively after being convicted of Mr Chen's murder.

References

External links

Burn Parish Council
Burn - Forgotten Airfields

Civil parishes in North Yorkshire
Selby District
Villages in North Yorkshire